Taylor Karl Gunman (born 14 March 1991 in Takapuna) is a New Zealand cyclist who last rode for . He won the 2015 UCI Oceania Tour following his victory in the Oceania Continental Championships road race.

Major results

2009
 1st Stage 3 Tour of Northland
 3rd Overall Tour de l'Abitibi
2010
 1st Stage 2 Tour of Northland
2011
 3rd The REV Classic
2013
 2nd Overall Tour of Southland
1st Prologue (TTT) & Stage 4
 3rd Time trial, National Under-23 Road Championships
2014
 1st  Time trial, National Road Championships
 1st Prologue (TTT) Tour of Southland
 6th Time trial, Oceania Road Championships
2015
 1st  Road race, Oceania Road Championships
 1st  Overall New Zealand Cycle Classic
2016
 3rd The REV Classic

References

External links
 

1991 births
Living people
New Zealand male cyclists
Sportspeople from Auckland
People from Takapuna
21st-century New Zealand people